Makenna Myler is an American track and field athlete from the state of Utah who became famous for competing in the 2020 United States Olympic Trials, where she placed 14th, approximately 7 months after giving birth to her daughter. She had previously garnered notierty for running one mile in 5 minutes 25 seconds approximately 1 week prior to giving birth. Myler ran for the BYU Cougars in college.

References

Living people
Track and field athletes from Utah
Year of birth missing (living people)